Venetian Court is a residential seaside resort located in Capitola, California. Construction of Venetian Court, in the Mediterranean Revival, Spanish Colonial Revival, and Mission Revival architecture styles, began in 1924 and continued for several years.

On April 2, 1987, Venetian Court was listed as site 87000574 on the National Register of Historic Places as one of the first condominium seaside developments in California, and is in a United States Historic District.

The two rows of colorful units nearest to the beach, as shown in the picture below, are privately owned condos (many of which are available as vacation rentals by owner).  The large brown building in the back row (nearest to the street) is now operated as the "Capitola Venetian Hotel".

References

External links 

History of Santa Cruz County, California
History of the Monterey Bay Area
Hotel buildings on the National Register of Historic Places in California
Historic districts on the National Register of Historic Places in California
Buildings and structures in Santa Cruz County, California
Mediterranean Revival architecture in California
Mission Revival architecture in California
Spanish Colonial Revival architecture in California
National Register of Historic Places in Santa Cruz County, California